Necrology is an EP by Swedish goregrind band General Surgery. The first press, released as 7" vinyl, includes only the first 5 tracks.

Re-released in 1993 by Nuclear Blast as cd in a "poster bag" format with a poster holding the lyrics on one side and the cover art on the other. Includes a sticker. Underground Series limited to 2,000 copies. It came with two bonus tracks.

Reissued and re-mastered in 2011 with different (orange colored) artwork, the bonus tracks from the 1993 re-release, and the following bonus tracks from the 1990 demo Pestisferous Anthropophagia.

The song "The Succulent Aftermath of a Subdural Hemorrhage" appears on the compilation 5 Years Nuclear Blast, 1993.

Track listing

Personnel
General Surgery
Grant McWilliams - Vocals
Joachim "Jocke" Carlsson - Guitars
Mats Nordrup - Drums
Matti Kärki - Bass, Vocals

Production
Matthew F. Jacobson - Executive producer
Jacob Speis - Layout
Scott Hull - Remastering
Gottfrid Jarnefors - Photography
Dangerous Dave Shirk - Mastering
Joacim Carlsson - Producer
Tomas Skogsberg - Producer, Engineering
William J. Yurkiewicz Jr. - Executive producer

1991 EPs
General Surgery (band) EPs